Calliphara excellens is a jewel bug in the family Scutelleridae. It is distributed in Nepal and India. Males engage in ritualistic Courtship display, walking around the female, touching his abdomen to the plant before touching the female's antennae. After mating, the female oviposits into the seed of a host plant, such as Macaranga tanarius.

References

Scutelleridae
Insects described in 1834
Insects of India
 Insects of Nepal